A - B - C - D - E - F - G - H - I - J - K - L - M - N - O - P - Q - R - S - T - U - V - W - XYZ

This is a list of rivers in the United States that have names starting with the letter I.  For the main page, which includes links to listings by state, see List of rivers in the United States.

I 
Ichawaynochaway Creek - Georgia
Ichetucknee River - Florida
Iditarod River - Alaska
Igushik River - Alaska
Illinois River - Arkansas, Oklahoma
Illinois River - Colorado
Illinois River - Illinois
Illinois River - Oregon
Imnaha River - Oregon
Imperial River - Florida
Independence River - New York
Indian Creek - West Virginia (Guyandotte River tributary)
Indian Creek - West Virginia (Middle Island Creek tributary)
Indian Creek - West Virginia (New River tributary)
Indian Head River - Massachusetts
Indian River - Alaska
Indian River - Delaware
Indian River - Florida
Indian River - Lower Peninsula Michigan
Indian River - Upper Peninsula Michigan
Indian River - New Hampshire
Indian River - South Dakota, a minor tributary of the Big Sioux River
Indian River - Virginia
Indian Stream - New Hampshire
Innoko River - Alaska
Iowa River - Iowa
Ipswich River - Massachusetts
Iron River (disambiguation) - Michigan
Iron River - Wisconsin (Bad River tributary)
Iron River - Wisconsin (Lake Superior tributary)
Iroquois River - Indiana, Illinois
Isabella River - Minnesota
Isinglass River - New Hampshire
Island Bayou - Oklahoma
Island Creek - West Virginia
Island River - Minnesota
Israel River - New Hampshire
Itkillik River - Alaska
Ivishak River - Alaska
Izavieknik River - Alaska

I